Blessed Edward Oldcorne Catholic College is a coeducational Roman Catholic secondary school located in Worcester, England, locally referred to as "Blesseds". It is a co-educational school, in which there are just over 1,000 students, aged between 11 and 16. The school was opened in 1963 as Blessed Edward Oldcorne School by the local Roman Catholic community and named after Edward Oldcorne, a Jesuit priest executed in 1606 for his part in the Gunpowder plot. The current head of the school is Greg Mcclarey who took over from Sean Devlin as head at the end of the 2016–2017 academic year.

The school has a wide catchment area and takes pupils from Droitwich and Pershorewithin Worcestershire. In 2011, 98% of pupils achieved five or more A*-C grades for GCSEs. The school is rated as a 'Category 1' school by the Local Authority.

For more information please look at the UK government website on Blessed Edward Oldcorne Catholic College https://www.get-information-schools.service.gov.uk/Establishments/Establishment/Details/116999#school-dashboard

Subjects 

As part of the school's structure, there are a variety of different subjects which form individual departments:

 Mathematics
 English
 Science
 Religious Education
 Physical Education
 Modern Foreign Languages
 Computing & Business
 Humanities
 Art & Design
 Design Technology
 Music

References

Schools in Worcester, England
Educational institutions established in 1963
Secondary schools in Worcestershire
Catholic secondary schools in the Archdiocese of Birmingham
1963 establishments in England
Voluntary aided schools in England